Sexor is the debut album by Canadian electronic musician Tiga, released in 2006 on the Different label. It won the 2007 Juno Award for Dance Recording of the Year. The album's cover art is based on Bryan Ferry's In Your Mind.

Track listing

Charts

Notes
 Far from Home was featured on all of the trailers and as the theme song for Sony PlayStation Home.
 Good As Gold/Flexible Skulls was featured as a song on the racing game Need For Speed: Carbon.

References

2006 albums
Tiga (musician) albums
Juno Award for Dance Recording of the Year recordings